Tomai is a commune and village in the Gagauz Autonomous Territorial Unit of the Republic of Moldova.  The 2004 census listed the commune as having a population of 5,014 people.  4,767 of the village residents were Gagauz. Minorities included 36 Moldovans, 80 Russians, 46 Ukrainians, 37 Bulgarians, 28 Roma plus 20 of other ethnicities.

Tomai's geographical coordinates are 46° 10' 54" North, 28° 46' 3" East

References

Tomai